Dendropsophus araguaya is a species of frogs in the family Hylidae.

It is endemic to Brazil. Its natural habitats are moist savanna, subtropical or tropical moist shrubland, subtropical or tropical high-altitude shrubland, freshwater marshes, and intermittent freshwater marshes. It is threatened by habitat loss.

Sources

araguaya
Endemic fauna of Brazil
Amphibians described in 1998
Taxonomy articles created by Polbot